Zaffer Calony is an area in Lahore District, Pakistan.

Violence 
In March 2015 a former police constable was shot dead in the colony.

References 

Samanabad Zone